Waberi may refer to:

Waberi District, district in Banaadir, Somalia

People with the given name
Waberi Hachi (born 1981), Djiboutian footballer

People with the surname
Abdirizak Waberi (born 1966), Swedisn politician
Abdourahman Waberi, Djiboutian writer
 Omar Ismail Waberi, Somali politician